Ján Kocian (born 13 March 1958) is a Slovak football coach and former player who last managed ViOn Zlaté Moravce in Fortuna Liga and also held managerial positions across central Europe and Asia.

Playing career
During his playing days, he made 209 appearances for Dukla Banská Bystrica between 1979 and 1988 before moving on to German club FC St. Pauli, where he made another 147 appearances up to 1993.

He was capped 26 times by Czechoslovakia. Playing at sweeper as the team reached the 1990 FIFA World Cup quarter-finals, Kocian was voted the country's player of the year in 1990.

Managerial career
Kocian began his coaching career with Czech side Petra Drnovice before moving to the German Bundesliga clubs Rot-Weiß Erfurt and Sportfreunde Siegen. He worked as an assistant at 1.Bundesliga clubs 1. FC Köln and Eintracht Frankfurt.

He was appointed the new head coach of the Slovakia national team on 2 November 2006, replacing Dušan Galis. Previously, he had worked as an assistant to former national coach Dr. Jozef Vengloš between 1993 and 1995. He was last seven months Assistant Coach from Karel Brückner by Austria between 4 March 2009.

On 8 December 2010, Kocian was officially announced as the new head coach for the Chinese Super League team Jiangsu Sainty On 28 June 2011, Kocian was announced as the Hong Kong First Division League team South China AA's new head coach. South China finished third in the 2011–12 Hong Kong First Division League. Kocian did not agree on a new contract after the end of the season.

In the 2013–14 season Kocian managed Ruch Chorzow to third position in the Ekstraklasa table and qualified almost in the last qualifying round for Europe League Group stage. After this season was Kocian was voted “Coach of the year 2013–2014” by the Ekstraklasa. On 18 April 2019, Kocian returned to Poland and to his former club Ruch Chorzów as an advisor.

On 25 October 2018, Kocian was announced as manager of the Yemen national team. After the 2019 AFC Asian Cup, he left the national team. In spring of 2022, he returned to his native Zlaté Moravce to manage local Fortuna Liga club FC ViOn and aid in avoiding relegation in 2021–22 season. Successfully completing the mission, the start to the 2022–23 season was largely unsuccessful with the club occupying relegation positions. In early October, Kocian came to terms of release with ViOn Zlaté Moravce due to medical reasons.

Football affiliated activities
Since mid-2010s, Kocian began to feature more prominentnly as an expert analyst in the media, including national broadcaster RTVS for national team matches or major tournaments, such as UEFA Euro 2020 or 2022 FIFA World Cup. He also writes as a columnist contributor to leading Slovak sports daily newspaper Denník Šport.

References

External links

 

1958 births
Living people
People from Zlaté Moravce
Sportspeople from the Nitra Region
Czechoslovak footballers
Slovak footballers
Slovak football managers
Slovak television people
Association football defenders
Czechoslovakia international footballers
1990 FIFA World Cup players
FC St. Pauli players
Bundesliga players
2. Bundesliga players
2019 AFC Asian Cup managers
Chinese Super League managers
Slovakia national football team managers
FK Dukla Banská Bystrica managers
FK Drnovice managers
FC VSS Košice managers
Eintracht Frankfurt non-playing staff
FC Rot-Weiß Erfurt managers
Sportfreunde Siegen managers
Jiangsu F.C. managers
Ruch Chorzów managers
Pogoń Szczecin managers
Podbeskidzie Bielsko-Biała managers
Yemen national football team managers
FC ViOn Zlaté Moravce managers
Slovak Super Liga managers
Czechoslovak expatriate footballers
Slovak expatriate football managers
Czechoslovak expatriate sportspeople in West Germany
Slovak expatriate sportspeople in Germany
Expatriate footballers in Germany
Expatriate football managers in Germany
Slovak expatriate sportspeople in the Czech Republic
Expatriate football managers in the Czech Republic
Slovak expatriate sportspeople in Austria
Expatriate football managers in Austria
Slovak expatriate sportspeople in China
Expatriate football managers in China
Slovak expatriate sportspeople in Hong Kong
Expatriate football managers in Hong Kong
Slovak expatriate sportspeople in Poland
Expatriate football managers in Poland
Slovak expatriate sportspeople in Yemen
Expatriate football managers in Yemen
Expatriate footballers in West Germany